John Rector is a prize-winning short story writer and author of the novels The Cold Kiss and The Grove. He lives in Omaha, Nebraska. The rights for his novels have been sold in North America, the United Kingdom, Germany and the Netherlands among others.

References 

 Jenny Brown Associates
 WOWT Channel 6: "Local Author Gets Attention of Big Name Publishers
 International Thriller Writers: Interview with John Rector
 National Review Online: "A Cool Thriller for the Dog Days"

External links 
 John Rector's personal website
 Jenny Brown Associates
 Tor/Forge Author Profile

Year of birth missing (living people)
Living people
21st-century American novelists
American male novelists
Writers from Omaha, Nebraska
21st-century American short story writers
21st-century American male writers